Davyd Venken (born 18 February 1977) is a professional Belgian darts player who plays in Professional Darts Corporation events.

He won the Belgium Gold Cup in 2009.

References

External links

1977 births
Living people
Belgian darts players